SS Harry Culbreath may refer to:

 , a Type C2-F ship laid down as Harry Culbreath; transferred to United States Navy as cargo ship USS Titania (AK-55); broken up in 1974
 , a Type C2-S-AJ1 ship; broken up in 1971

Ship names